Peter Šťastný (born 18 September 1956), also known colloquially as "Peter the Great" and "Stosh", is a Slovak-Canadian former professional ice hockey player who played in the National Hockey League (NHL) from 1980 to 1995. Šťastný is the second-highest scorer of the 1980s, after Wayne Gretzky. During his time with the Quebec Nordiques, Šťastný became a Canadian citizen. From 2004 to 2014, he served as a Member of the European Parliament for Slovakia. During his NHL career, he played with the Quebec Nordiques, New Jersey Devils, and St. Louis Blues.

He was inducted into the Hockey Hall of Fame in 1998 and ranks 34th all time in NHL points (and second overall for players born in Slovakia). In 2017, Šťastný was named one of the '100 Greatest NHL Players' in history. He is the father of current Carolina Hurricanes forward Paul Stastny.

NHL career
Šťastný was a prolific scorer in the NHL in the 1980s. He started his career in the NHL with the Quebec Nordiques in 1980 and was traded in 1990 to the New Jersey Devils. As a star member of a team playing in a francophone city, Šťastný endeared himself to the Quebec fans by learning to speak French, and later learned to speak English. He retired as a member of the St. Louis Blues in 1995.

When the startling news broke in 1980 that Czechoslovakia player of the year, Šťastný, and his brother, Anton, had defected to Canada to play with the Quebec Nordiques, it represented a watershed moment in professional ice hockey as one of the first major stars of Eastern bloc hockey to join the NHL. The following year, his brother, Marián, joined them and they became the third trio of brothers to play on the same professional ice hockey team (the first being the Bentley brothers of the Chicago Blackhawks in the 1940s and the second being the Plager brothers of the St. Louis Blues in the 1970s). Peter and Anton share the rookie record for points in a game, with 8, which they accomplished in the same game against the Washington Capitals on February 22, 1981. Two days earlier, they each recorded six points against the Vancouver Canucks. These two games, played two days apart, are four out of the nine total instances in which rookies have recorded at least 6 points in a game.

The trickle of Czechoslovak and Soviet hockey players rapidly became a flood following his footsteps. According to Peter, his defection "was the best decision I ever made. It has given my family the choices and options that people behind the Iron Curtain could only dream of. Then, to play pro hockey with my two brothers was like icing on the cake."

On the ice, Peter proved to be both consistent and productive. He scored 450 goals and added 789 assists for a total of 1239 points in the regular season. After retiring as a player, he captained the Slovak national team in various international tournaments and still enjoys huge popularity among Slovaks.

NHL milestones and records

1st player in NHL history to collect over 100 points in rookie year (109). Note: Wayne Gretzky had 137 points in his first year in the NHL (1979–80), but was not considered a "rookie", due to his time spent with the World Hockey Association's Indianapolis Racers and Edmonton Oilers, where he won the rookie of the year award in that league during the 1978–79 season with 110 points.
Shares NHL record for assists by a rookie (70) with Joé Juneau (Gretzky had 86 assists in his first year).
Holds NHL record for points in a game by a rookie with 8 (four goals and four assists on 22 February 1981 against Washington Capitals).
Holds NHL record for points in a road game with 8 (four goals and four assists on 22 February 1981 against Washington Capitals).
Holds NHL record for points in 2 consecutive games with 14 (3 goals and 3 assists on 20 February 1981 against Vancouver Canucks and 4 goals and 4 assists on 22 February 1981 against Washington Capitals).

Personal life
Šťastný was born in Bratislava, the fourth son of Stanislav and Frantiska Šťastný. His two older brothers, Vladimir (born 1945) and Bohumil (born 1947), were born when the family still lived in the village of Pružina, about 170 kilometres northeast of Bratislava. They moved to Bratislava before the birth of Marián (1953), Peter (1956), Anton (1959), and Eva (1966). Stanislav worked for a state-run company that built hydro-electric dams until 1980 when he retired, and mainly dealt with managing inventory. Frantiska stayed at home and raised the children. Vladimir served as an assistant coach of the Slovak national ice hockey team. He is the only coach with all three medals in Slovak ice hockey history.

Peter is the father of Yan Stastny, and Paul Stastny. Paul began his career with the Colorado Avalanche (the same franchise as the Quebec Nordiques, Peter's first NHL team) in 2006–07, followed by the St. Louis Blues, for whom Peter also played. Paul also played for Vegas Golden Knights and currently plays for the Carolina Hurricanes . Yan made his NHL debut in 2005–06 with the Edmonton Oilers and last played professionally for the EHC Lustenau in 2018. Born in Quebec City but raised in St. Louis, Yan played for Team USA in the 2005 and 2006 World Championships. Paul would represent Team USA in the 2010 Winter Olympics and 2014 Winter Olympics. The family is the first ice hockey family known to have represented four countries in international play (Czechoslovakia, Canada, Slovakia, United States). Paul broke the record for a scoring streak in a rookie season in the NHL and was a finalist for the 2006–07 Calder Memorial Trophy, which was won by his father in 1980–81.

Career in politics

Šťastný has always been known for his resentment of the Communist regime in Czechoslovakia. He joined the party SDKÚ-DS of the former Prime-minister Mikuláš Dzurinda to pursue a career in the European Parliament since he is fluent in both English and French. He was elected as leader of the 2004 European Parliament candidate list for the SDKU.

In the June 2009 election he was re-elected as the second of his party's MEPs. His campaign slogan was "With Courage and Determination for a Strong Slovakia" (Slovak: S odvahou a nasadením pre silné Slovensko). He was MEP until 2014.
 
He is a signatory of the Prague Declaration on European Conscience and Communism.

Široký controversy
Šťastný has called for Juraj Široký to step-down as the President of Slovak Ice Hockey Federation, stating poor performance, pursuing own financial interests over the welfare of Slovak Hockey as well as moral incredibility after it was revealed that Mr Široký was former ŠtB officer and he still has not sufficiently explained his friendship and involvement with Viktor Kožený and his fraudulent financial manoeuvres regarding so-called Harvard Funds. These grievances were penned in a letter to René Fasel in a letter describing Široký as a threat to democracy and integrity of the game in March 2008, as a result of Široký's actions in the 1980s (during which time Peter and two of his brothers had defected to Canada). Three months later, with Široký having not resigned from HC Slovan Bratislava, for whom Šťastný had played prior to his defection to Canada, or the Slovak Ice Hockey Federation, Šťastný resigned from the Slovak Hockey Hall of Fame as a result, and had all references to him pulled from Samsung Arena, the home arena of Slovan at the time.

International play

Šťastný was the first player in ice hockey history to represent three countries in three international tournaments.

Awards
Calder Memorial Trophy – 1981
Played in 6 NHL All-Star Games – 1981, 1982, 1983, 1984, 1986, 1988
World Championships Best Forward Award – 1995
Inducted into Hockey Hall of Fame – 1998
Ranked number 56 on The Hockey News''' list of the 100 Greatest Hockey Players, the highest-ranking Slovak-trained (or Czechoslovak-trained) player – 1998
Inducted into IIHF Hall of Fame – 2000
Inducted into Slovak Hockey Hall of Fame – 2002 – but he voluntarily quit and had his trophies retrieved as a form of protest against Mr Široký.
Inducted into Czech Ice Hockey Hall of Fame - 2010

Career statistics
Regular season and playoffs

International

See also
 List of NHL statistical leaders
 Notable families in the NHL
 List of NHL players with 1,000 points

References

Bibliography
 2003 NHL Official Guide & Record Book'', pages 167, 196, 200. Dan Diamond and Associates, Inc.  (Canada),  (United States)

External links
 
 Profile at the European Parliament Website
 
 
 

1956 births
Living people
Calder Trophy winners
Canadian expatriate ice hockey players in the United States
Canadian ice hockey centres
Canadian people of Slovak descent
Czechoslovak defectors
Czechoslovak emigrants to Canada
Czechoslovak expatriate sportspeople in the United States
Czechoslovak ice hockey centres
HC Slovan Bratislava players
Hockey Hall of Fame inductees
Ice hockey people from Bratislava
Ice hockey players at the 1980 Winter Olympics
Ice hockey players at the 1994 Winter Olympics
IIHF Hall of Fame inductees
MEPs for Slovakia 2004–2009
MEPs for Slovakia 2009–2014
National Hockey League All-Stars
National Hockey League players with retired numbers
Naturalized citizens of Canada
New Jersey Devils players
Olympic ice hockey players of Czechoslovakia
Olympic ice hockey players of Slovakia
Quebec Nordiques players
Slovak anti-communists
Slovak Democratic and Christian Union – Democratic Party MEPs
Slovak emigrants to Canada
Slovak expatriate ice hockey players in the United States
Slovak ice hockey centres
Slovak sportsperson-politicians
St. Louis Blues players
St. Louis Blues scouts
Undrafted National Hockey League players